PrimaLoft® is a brand of patented synthetic microfiber thermal insulation material that was developed for the United States Army in the 1980s. PrimaLoft is a registered trademark of PrimaLoft, Inc., the brand's parent company.

PrimaLoft synthetic insulation is used in outerwear, gloves, sleeping bags, and footwear.  It is also used as a down alternative in pillows, comforters, and mattress toppers.

In 2007, PrimaLoft introduced a product extension of yarn. The yarn is 100% polyester or a blend of 45% polyester fibers and 55% merino wool, and is used in socks, sweaters, base layers, and accessories intended mainly for outdoor wear.

In 2010, PrimaLoft was the first maker of branded insulation to be recognized for compliance with the bluesign criteria for environmental effect.  In 2015, PrimaLoft was the largest global supplier of bluesign approved insulation.There are several criteria that govern the use of the bluesign, which are designed to increase the productivity of resources while protecting the environment.

The primary focus of PrimaLoft is to manufacture fabric base layers, mid-layers, outerwear, and accessories.

History
In 1983 the U.S. Army Research Laboratory in Natick, MA approached PrimaLoft's former parent company Albany International Corp., a global advanced textile and material processing company, to develop a water resistant synthetic alternative to goose down for use in military sleeping bags and clothing systems in variable environmental conditions. The U.S. Army was primarily interested in a synthetic insulation that would be comparable to goose down in weight, compressibility, and warmth, but also retain heat while in the presence of moisture. In 1985, United States Patent 4,588,635 for "synthetic down" was filed and ultimately approved in May 1986. This original non-woven insulation would eventually be renamed as PrimaLoft ONE. PrimaLoft was then established as a business subsidiary of Albany International Corp. in 1988 for commercialization.

In 1989, the first commercially available PrimaLoft insulated garment was manufactured by L.L.Bean.  A 1990 New York Times article titled  "Outdoor Wear: Sorting Out the Choices" featured statements by Edward Howell, then L.L. Bean's director of product development, describing PrimaLoft insulation as a high-loft synthetic alternative to down with similar performance dry, but superior performance wet. Since then, PrimaLoft has gone on to become a major supplier of high performance, technical insulation for the outdoor industry.

On June 29, 2012, PrimaLoft, Inc. completed the acquisition of the assets of PrimaLoft® from former parent Albany International Corp. The company then became a privately held company as a result of the transaction.  PrimaLoft, Inc. moved its headquarters to Latham, NY in December 2013.

In October, 2017, PrimaLoft, Inc. was acquired by an investor group led by private equity firm Victor Capital Partners, in partnership with Allstate's private equity group.

PrimaLoft was introduced into new insulation product segments as follows:
1989: Jackets by L.L.Bean
1992: Sleeping bags by Caribou
1992: Gloves by Sand & Siman
1993: Home furnishings by Lands' End
2000: Footwear by L.L. Bean

Thermal performance
Throughout history, wool has been regarded as the best material to use for cold, wet weather due to its ability to provide insulation when wet. In cold and dry areas, down has been relied upon for warmth and comfort, but it becomes a liability when it gets wet. There is no doubt that the design goal of PrimaLoft was to create a fabric that would offer the same level of insulation effectiveness as down, even when wet.

The original patent filed for PrimaLoft insulation, known as "Synthetic Down" and filed in May 1986, describes a particular mix of synthetic microfibers and macrofibers that compares favorably to down. It was proven to provide an equally efficient thermal barrier, be of equivalent density, possess similar compressional properties, have improved wetting and drying characteristics, and have superior loft retention when wet. The latter point illustrates PrimaLoft's primary advantage over down. Unlike down, PrimaLoft is able to retain 96% of its insulating capability when wet by maintaining its loft, and therefore is used in clothing and equipment intended to be used in cold, wet conditions, such as jackets, parkas, gloves, sleeping bags and footwear.

In terms of the intrinsic warmth of a jacket, this is largely determined by both the type of PrimaLoft branded insulation used in the construction of the jacket, as well as the thickness of that insulation. A thicker insulation will ensure that there is more airspace in which to trap the body heat as a result of the insulation being able to trap more heat. As a result, the activity levels and the warmth value of garments insulated with PrimaLoft products are largely determined by the wearer and the intended use of the garment.

Sustainable Products 
PrimaLoft first introduced a product containing post-consumer recycled content in 2007, meant for footwear applications.

In 2016, PrimaLoft introduced a synthetic insulation product for apparel containing 55% post-consumer recycled content. This application was first used by Patagonia in their Nano Puff line of products.

In 2018, PrimaLoft announced three insulation products made from 100% post-consumer recycled content.

Also in 2018, PrimaLoft announced the development of a synthetic insulation made from biodegradable fibers.

Yarn
Products made of PrimaLoft Yarn are available in 100% polyester or a blend of 45% polyester and 55% merino wool, both of which provide high levels of comfort and moisture management for the end user.

PrimaLoft was introduced into new yarn product segments as follows:
2006: Socks by L.L. Bean
2010: Sweaters by ExOfficio
2011: Base Layer by Adidas Outdoor

Fabrics 
PrimaLoft has recently introduced a line of fabrics for the construction of base layers, mid-layers, outerwear and accessories.

PrimaLoft fabrics are used by brands such as Athleta, Cotopaxi, Buff, Lands’ End and L.L. Bean.

Certifications
Third party testing and certification validates all performance claims published about PrimaLoft products.  A list of these certifications include:
Thermal performance validations at Hohenstein Institute in Bonnigheim, Germany
Thermal performance testing at Kansas State University’s  textile and apparel research institutions
ISO 11092 certification for thermal wet/dry performance
Oeko-tex standard 100 environmental evaluation standard
bluesign certification for environmental impact
Global Recycled Standard for third-party certification of recycled content, chain of custody, social and environmental practices and chemical restrictions.
ASTM D5511 testing for biodegradable fiber technology

Care
According to the company website, PrimaLoft insulation products are machine washable in cold water and dryable on gentle cycle. Garments are recommended to be tumble dried in a home dryer at low temperatures, and the use of the extreme heats and caustic chemicals of dry cleaning, irons, and bleach detergents must be avoided. Specific care instructions vary per garment.

References

External links
 Official Website

Brand name materials
Insulators